The Norwegian Men's Curling Championship is the national championship of men's curling in Norway. It has been held annually since 1957. It is organized by the Norwegian Curling Association.

List of champions and medallists
(Team line-up in order: skip (marked bold), third, second, lead, alternate(s), coach)

References

See also
Norwegian Women's Curling Championship
Norwegian Mixed Curling Championship
Norwegian Mixed Doubles Curling Championship
Norwegian Junior Curling Championships

Curling competitions in Norway

National curling championships
Recurring sporting events established in 1957
1957 establishments in Norway
Curling